Qoumenjan (also Romanized as Qūmenjān; also known as Qomenjān, Qomīnjān, and Kūminju) is a village in Paskuh Rural District, Sedeh District, Qaen County, South Khorasan Province, Iran. At the 2006 census, its population was 835, in 204 families.

References 

Populated places in Qaen County